Southwest Region School District (SWRSD) or Southwest Region Schools is a school district headquartered in Dillingham, Alaska. The district serves the area around Bristol Bay. Its communities are in the Dillingham Census Area.

History

Don Evans began his term as the district superintendent in 1993. In 1998 he left and founded Education Resources Inc., a company that provides administrative services to rural Alaska school districts. That year Education Resources Inc. began providing such services to the Southwest Region district. Marie Paul, a member of the Southwest Region board originating from Togiak, stated that the quality of administrative services remained the same.

In 1999 the school district had 775 students living in nine areas.

Schools
 Aleknagik School - Aleknagik
 Clarks Point School - Clarks Point - Due to declining enrollment, it closed in May 2012, but re-opened in 2017
 William "Sonny" Nelson School - Ekwok
 Koliganek School - Koliganek
 Manokotak 'Nunaniq' School - Manokotak
 "Chief" Ivan Blunka School - New Stuyahok
 Togiak School - Togiak
 Twin Hills School - Twin Hills

Former schools:

 Portage Creek School - Portage Creek

References

External links
 

School districts in Alaska
Education in Unorganized Borough, Alaska
Dillingham Census Area, Alaska